William James Solomon (born July 20, 1978) is an American former professional basketball player. He played parts of three seasons in the NBA, and three seasons in the Israeli Basketball Premier League.

Amateur career
Solomon was first noticed at East Hartford High School in East Hartford, Connecticut. He held several records and is in several clubs in their schools basketball program such as "1000 Career Points", "All State", "All Conference", and the only member of the  "NBA Draft" club. He went to Clemson where he continued his basketball career. He was named first-team All-Atlantic Coast Conference (ACC) as a junior, and made the second team as a senior.

Professional career
Solomon declared himself eligible for the 2001 NBA draft after his junior year at Clemson University. He was selected by the Vancouver Grizzlies in the second round, with the 32nd overall pick. Solomon played for the Grizzlies in the 2001–02 season and averaged 5.2 points, 1.5 assists and 1.1 rebounds over 62 games.

After only one year in the NBA, Solomon decided to move to Europe and signed a contract with the Greek team Aris Thessaloniki in 2003. That year he won the FIBA EuroCup Challenge, 4th-tier European competition.

After a year in Greece, Solomon moved to Israel and played for Hapoel Jerusalem, with whom he won another European title, the ULEB Cup, 2nd-tier European competition. In Israel he was often nicknamed "The Fish" (Ha-dag, הדג), as in Hebrew his last name resembles "Salmon" much more than King Solomon, which is pronounced "Shlomo".

For 2004–05, he moved to Turkey and was signed by Efes Pilsen. He then played for the first time in his career in the EuroLeague. With the help of Solomon, Efes Pilsen won the Turkish championship that year.

Solomon moved back to Israel the following season and was signed by Maccabi Tel Aviv, who were the European champions the previous two seasons and were close to winning a third consecutive EuroLeague title before losing in the final. After this, he returned to İstanbul and joined Fenerbahçe, that enjoyed a high budget and a EuroLeague spot after the Ülker Food Group decided to close their own team and move their entire support of funds and players to Fenerbahçe Ülker's basketball team. Nicknamed 'King Solomon' by the Fenerbahçe fans, he helped the team win two championships.

Solomon also played point guard for the Washington Wizards summer league team in Las Vegas during the NBA's off-season in 2006.

On July 28, 2008, Solomon was signed by the Toronto Raptors.

On February 19, 2009, Solomon was traded to the Sacramento Kings in a three-team deal that sent Patrick O'Bryant to the Raptors from the Boston Celtics and a conditional second round pick in 2014 to the Celtics. Shortly after being traded to the Sacramento Kings, Will Solomon was waived.

Solomon's final NBA game was played on April 3, 2009 in a 111 - 139 loss to the Phoenix Suns where Solomon recorded no stats in 3 minutes of playing time.

On April 9, 2009, the Turkish champions Fenerbahçe reached an agreement with him in order to bring him back to his former team, but he was released from his contract on November 7, 2009.

In August 2010, he returned to Israel and signed a one-year contract with pro club Hapoel Jerusalem.

In the summer of 2011, he signed a contract with the Ukrainian team Cherkaski Mavpy.

In October 2012, he signed a contract with Mersin BB of the Turkish Basketball League for the 2012–13 season.

In November 2013, he signed with the French team Shark Antibes.

Career statistics

NBA

Regular season

|-
| style="text-align:left;"| 
| style="text-align:left;"| Memphis
| 62 || 4 || 14.1 || .341 || .284 || .671 || 1.1 || 1.5 || .6 || .1 || 5.2
|-
| style="text-align:left;"| 
| style="text-align:left;"| Toronto
| 39 || 9 || 13.9 || .436 || .263 || .833 || 1.1 || 3.2 || .5 || .1 || 4.9
|-
| style="text-align:left;"| 
| style="text-align:left;"| Sacramento
| 14 || 0 || 12.0 || .406 || .448 || .500 || 1.5 || .7 || .5 || .0 || 5.0
|- class="sortbottom"
| style="text-align:center;" colspan="2"| Career
| 115 || 13 || 13.8 || .378 || .298 || .692 || 1.1 || 2.0 || .5 || .1 || 5.1

EuroLeague

|-
| style="text-align:left;"| 2004–05
| style="text-align:left;"| Efes Pilsen
| 23 || 23 || 30.3 || .433 || .348 || .785 || 2.4 || 2.6 || 2.0 || .3 || 14.5 || 14.0
|-
| style="text-align:left;"| 2005–06
| style="text-align:left;"| Maccabi
| 25 || 23 || 32.2 || .464 || .386 || .798 || 2.4 || 3.0 || 2.0 || .2 || 15.0 || 13.6
|-
| style="text-align:left;"| 2006–07
| style="text-align:left;"| Fenerbahçe
| 11 || 10 || 32.1 || .422 || .388 || .889 || 2.9 || 3.8 || 1.9 || .3 || 13.6 || 11.6
|-
| style="text-align:left;"| 2007–08
| style="text-align:left;"| Fenerbahçe
| 21 || 21 || 31.1 || .466 || .378 || .818 || 3.1 || 3.9 || 1.7 || .1 || 17.9 || 18.0
|-
| style="text-align:left;"| 2009–10
| style="text-align:left;"| Fenerbahçe
| 2 || 2 || 26.3 || .333 || .250 || .800 || 1.0 || 1.5 || .5 || .0 || 9.0 || 3.5
|- class="sortbottom"
| style="text-align:center;" colspan="2"| Career
| 82 || 79 || 31.2 || .448 || .370 || .806 || 2.6 || 3.2 || 1.9 || .2 || 15.3 || 14.4

References

External links

 
 Will Solomon at draftexpress.com
 Will Solomon at eurobasket.com
 Will Solomon at euroleague.net
 Will Solomon at tblstat.net

1978 births
Living people
African-American basketball players
American expatriate basketball people in Canada
American expatriate basketball people in France
American expatriate basketball people in Greece
American expatriate basketball people in Israel
American expatriate basketball people in Turkey
American expatriate basketball people in Ukraine
American men's basketball players
Anadolu Efes S.K. players
Aris B.C. players
Basketball players from Hartford, Connecticut
BC Cherkaski Mavpy players
Clemson Tigers men's basketball players
Fenerbahçe men's basketball players
Greek Basket League players
Hapoel Jerusalem B.C. players
Israeli Basketball Premier League players
Maccabi Tel Aviv B.C. players
Memphis Grizzlies players
Mersin Büyükşehir Belediyesi S.K. players
Olympique Antibes basketball players
Point guards
Sacramento Kings players
Shooting guards
Toronto Raptors players
Vancouver Grizzlies draft picks
People from East Hartford, Connecticut
21st-century African-American sportspeople
20th-century African-American sportspeople
AS Salé (basketball) players